The 1959 Western Australian state election was held on 21 March 1959.

Retiring Members

Labor

 Joseph Sleeman (MLA) (Fremantle)

Country

 Lindsay Thorn (MLA) (Toodyay)

Legislative Assembly
Sitting members are shown in bold text. Successful candidates are highlighted in the relevant colour. Where there is possible confusion, an asterisk (*) is also used.

See also
 Members of the Western Australian Legislative Assembly, 1956–1959
 Members of the Western Australian Legislative Assembly, 1959–1962
 1960 Western Australian Legislative Council election
 1959 Western Australian state election

References
 

Candidates for Western Australian state elections